Kyle Jarrow (born October 7, 1979) is a Los Angeles–based writer and rock musician.

Career

Writing
Jarrow's writing career began in theater, winning an Obie Award with director Alex Timbers in 2004 for A Very Merry Unauthorized Children's Scientology Pageant, a satirical musical about L. Ron Hubbard and Scientology. His theatrical writing has been noted for its macabre humor and frequent incorporation of pop music. Early credits include Armless, the basis for the film of the same name, and Whisper House, a musical written with Duncan Sheik.  As Jarrow's career progressed he became frustrated with the reach of theater and began writing for television and film as well.

Jarrow's writing for television and film has frequently focused on existential questions of what to believe and how to live.  His first feature film was 2010 Sundance Film Festival NEXT selection Armless, a comedy about a man suffering body integrity identity disorder, starring Daniel London and Janel Moloney.  Armless was directed by Habib Azar, with whom Jarrow collaborated again in 2014 on Saint Janet, an independent film about a woman who believes she has spoken to God, starring Kelly Bishop and Nyambi Nyambi.

In 2012 Jarrow developed a police drama for FX produced by Philip Seymour Hoffman.   In 2013 The CW announced development of Ze, a family drama series written by Jarrow about a transgender teen.  Ze would have represented the first time a transgender person has been the lead character on a broadcast television show. In 2016, Kyle created Lost Generation, a digital series with music by Duncan Sheik for Verizon's go90 network. He is the creator and executive producer of the military drama TV series Valor which premiered  on The CW network in October 2017 and is now streaming on Netflix.

Kyle wrote the book for SpongeBob SquarePants, The Broadway Musical which opened at Broadway's Palace Theatre in December 2017. He has been nominated for a Tony Award, Drama Desk Award, and Outer Critics Association Award for his work on the show.

Music
Jarrow is singer, songwriter, and keyboardist for the theatrical rock band Sky-Pony, a collaboration with his wife Lauren Worsham.  He has previously performed with bands Super Mirage and The Fabulous Entourage, an art rock band featured in the 2006 Whitney Biennial.

Personal life
Jarrow was born and raised in Ithaca, New York.  His father is economist Robert A. Jarrow and his mother, Gail Jarrow, writes children's books.    He studied Religious Studies and American Studies at Yale University, moving to New York City upon graduation.  Jarrow lives in Los Angeles, California with his wife, actress Lauren Worsham.  In December 2015, Worsham and Jarrow announced they were expecting their first child, Oona. In December 2019, the couple announced the arrival of their second daughter on Facebook.

Works

Theater

President Harding is a Rock Star (2003)
A Very Merry Unauthorized Children's Scientology Pageant (2004) - Obie Award
Armless (2004) - Overall Excellence Award, NY Fringe Festival
Gorilla Man (2005)
Rip Me Open (2006)
Love Kills (2007)
Hostage Song (2008)
The List (2010)
Whisper House (2010)
Trigger (2011)
The Consequences (2012)
Sky-Pony: Raptured (2012)
Noir (2015)
The Wildness (2016) - Lortel Award nomination
The SpongeBob Musical (2017)

Television

Lost Generation (2016) go90
Valor (2017–18) The CW Network
The Drop (in pre-production)
Star Trek: Discovery, Season Four (2022)

Film

Armless (2010)
Saint Janet (2014)

References

External links
KyleJarrow.com, Web site, Kyle Jarrow
Kyle Jarrow at Internet Off-Broadway Database

Living people
1979 births
American male screenwriters
Obie Award recipients
Yale University alumni
Musicians from Ithaca, New York
Writers from New York City
Musicians from New York City
Songwriters from New York (state)
Writers from Ithaca, New York
Screenwriters from New York (state)
21st-century American screenwriters
21st-century American male writers